Aurora Gaio (born 18 February 1999) is an Italian professional racing cyclist, who last rode for the UCI Women's Team  during the 2019 women's road cycling season.

References

External links
 

1999 births
Living people
Italian female cyclists
People from Marostica
Cyclists from the Province of Vicenza